Dean Richard Widders (born 25 October 1979) is an Anaiwan Indigenous Australian former professional rugby league footballer who played in the 2000s and 2010s. He works with the National Rugby League as an Indigenous Pathways manager.  He is coach of the Parramatta Eels team in the 2022 NRLW season. 

A skillful forward as a player, Widders has always been passionate about rugby league and the difference it can make in the community particularly for people from remote and rural areas and Indigenous Australians. He has been a great advocate for women playing the game and coached the Indigenous Women's All Stars in their win over the Jillaroos in 2017.  He delivers workshops to youth on leadership, decision making and goal setting and is involved in numerous programs in schools. He recently played and coached the Redfern All Blacks to a record equaling 3 grand final wins in a row plus 2 Koori Knockouts in a row from 2015-2017. He proudly won three koori knockouts with his hometown Narwan Eels in the 2000s.

Early life
Widders was born in Armidale in New South Wales, Australia.

He played his first game of rugby league at the age of six for the local Armidale colts after watching his father Jake Widders who was a great player for the famous Aboriginal team the Narwan Eels. He tried many other sports but excelled especially in rugby league. Widders was also an avid reader during his childhood, a skill that he continues to promote.

During Widders' teenage years he honed his rugby league skills and became well known in the local area as a lock playing for the Armidale Greens and Narwan Eels. During this time, Arthur Beetson Sydney Roosters selector flew to Armidale to see Widders' play. When Widders' was 14, in 1993, he was invited to a selection trial and proved to be one of the best players.

Playing career

NRL
In 1996, at the age of 17, Widders' moved to Sydney to play with the Sydney Roosters. In this year, he also captained an Aboriginal side.

Widders made his debut for the Roosters in 2000, playing in 13 NRL matches for the club. In 2002, Widders signed with the Parramatta Eels; in 2005 he was part of The Parramatta side that won the minor premiership. He finished with the club at the end of 2006.

Widders' was involved in a racial vilification incident in July 2005 when he was abused by South Sydney Rabbitohs captain Bryan Fletcher. In 2006, he signed a three-year contract to play for the South Sydney Rabbitohs starting in 2007.

Castleford Tigers
Widders joined Castleford (Heritage № 899) for the 2009 season. He played 19 times in his first season for the Tigers, scoring 6 tries.

Widders started 2010 in great fashion, scoring the final and clinching try away at Headingley in Castleford's opening game against the Leeds Rhinos.

Widders played in 2011 and had a good season, which was his final season at the Castleford Tigers. The club failed to make the playoffs after a narrow defeat by Hull KR. Widders said his final goodbyes to the Castleford public in the last home game against Hull F.C.

Off-field
In 1997, Widders returned to Duval High School in Armidale to complete his Higher School Certificate.

Widders is very well respected in his hometown of Armidale. In 2004, he was awarded the NRL's Ken Stephen Medal for his positive work with youth in the community and, in 2006, he was appointed to the Federal Government's National Indigenous Council. Widders is also an Ambassador for the National Aboriginal Sports Corporation Australia (NASCA).

In November 2018, Widders participated in the Legends of League tournament for Parramatta, which was held at the Central Coast Stadium in Gosford.

He is coach of the Parramatta Eels team in the 2022 NRLW season.

Career highlights
Junior Club: Armidale, Narwan
Career Stats: 219 first grade games scoring 59 tries
Representative Honours: Country Origin (2006), Prime Minister's XIII (2007)
Honours: Minor Premiership (2005) with Parramatta

Footnotes

External links

Castleford Tigers profile
Literally, Eels bookworm is a national hero
Article on Racial Vilification Incident
Deadly Vibe interview with Dean Widders
Community Champions - Dean Widders

1979 births
Living people
Australian Aboriginal rugby league team players
Australian rugby league players
Castleford Tigers players
Country New South Wales Origin rugby league team players
Indigenous Australian rugby league players
North Sydney Bears NSW Cup players
Parramatta Eels players
Prime Minister's XIII players
Rugby league centres
Rugby league five-eighths
Rugby league locks
Rugby league players from Armidale, New South Wales
Rugby league second-rows
South Sydney Rabbitohs players
Sydney Roosters players